The Psoraceae are a family of lichenized fungi in the order Lecanorales. The Austrian Botanist and Lichenologist Alexander Zahlbruckner first described the family in 1898. Species of this family have a widespread distribution.

Genera
This is a list of the genera contained within the Psoraceae, based on a 2020 review and summary of ascomycete classification. Following the genus name is the taxonomic authority, year of publication, and the number of species:
Brianaria  – 4 spp.
Glyphopeltis  – 1 sp.
Protoblastenia  – 30 spp.
Protomicarea  – 2 spp.
Psora  – 35 spp.
Psorula  – 1 sp.

References

Lecanorales
Lichen families
Lecanoromycetes families
Taxa named by Alexander Zahlbruckner
Taxa described in 1898